North Point Park may refer to:

North Point Park (Van Buren County, Michigan)
North Point Park (Massachusetts)
North Point State Park, Maryland